The Kanuri people (Kanouri, Kanowri, also Yerwa, Baribari and several subgroup names) are an African ethnic group living largely in the lands of the former Kanem and Bornu Empires in Niger, Nigeria, Sudan, Libya and Cameroon. Those generally termed Kanuri include several subgroups and dialect groups, some of whom identify as distinct from the Kanuri. Most trace their origins to ruling lineages of the medieval Kanem-Bornu Empire, and its client states or provinces. In contrast to the neighboring Toubou or Zaghawa pastoralists, Kanuri groups have traditionally been sedentary, engaging in farming, fishing the Chad Basin, and engaged in trade and salt processing.

Background
Kanuri peoples include several subgroups, and identify by different names in some regions. The Kanuri language was the major language of the Bornu Empire and remains a major language in southeastern Niger, northeastern Nigeria and northern Cameroon, but in Chad it is limited to a handful of speakers in urban centers.

The largest population of Kanuri reside in the northeast corner of Nigeria, where the ceremonial Emirate of Bornu traces direct descent from the Kanem-Bornu empire, founded sometime before 1000 CE. Some 3 million Kanuri speakers live in Nigeria, not including some 200,000 speakers of the Manga dialect. The Nga people in Bauchi State trace their origins to a Kanuri diaspora.

In southeastern Niger, where they form the majority of the sedentary population, the Kanuri are commonly called Baribari (a Hausa name). The 400,000 Kanuri population in Niger includes the Manga subgroup, numbering some 100,000 (1997) in the area east of Zinder, who regard themselves as distinct from the Baribari.

Around 40,000 (1998) members of the Tumari subgroup, sometimes called Kanembu, are a distinct Kanuri subgroup living in the N'guigmi area, and are distinct from the Chadian Kanembu people. In the Kaour escarpment oasis of eastern Niger, the Kanuri are further divided into the Bilma subgroup, numbering some 20,000 (2003), and are the dominant ethnic group in the salt evaporation and trade industry of Bilma.

Kanuri speak varieties of Kanuri, one of the Nilo-Saharan languages. Divisions include the Manga, Tumari, and Bilma dialects of Kanuri and the more distinct Kanembu language.

Inheriting the religious and cultural traditions of the Kanem-Bornu state, Kanuri peoples are predominantly Sunni Muslim.

In Chad, Kanembu speakers differentiate themselves from the larg Kanuri ethnicity. The Kanembu are centered in Lac Prefecture and southern Kanem Prefecture. Although Kanuri was the major language of the Bornu Empire, in Chad, Kanuri speakers are limited to handfuls of speakers in urban centers. Kanuri remains a major language in southeastern Niger, northeastern Nigeria and northern Cameroon.

In the early 1980s, the Kanembu constituted the greatest part of the population of Lac Prefecture, but some Kanembu also lived in the Chari-Baguirmi Prefecture. Once the core ethnic group of the Kanem-Borno Empire, whose territories at one time included northeastern Nigeria and southern Libya, the Kanembu retain ties beyond the borders of Chad. For example, close family and commercial ties bind them with the Kanuri of northeastern Nigeria. Within Chad, many Kanembu of Lac and Kanem prefectures identify with the Alifa of Mao, the governor of the region in precolonial times.

Originally a pastoral people, the Kanuri were one of many Nilo-Saharan groups indigenous to the Central South Sahara, beginning their expansion in the area of Lake Chad in the late 7th century, and absorbing both indigenous Nilo-Saharan and Chadic (Afro-Asiatic) speakers. According to Kanuri tradition, Sef, son of Dhu Ifazan of Yemen, arrived in Kanem in the ninth century and united the population into the Sayfawa dynasty.  This tradition however, is likely a product of later Islamic influence, reflecting the association with their Arabian origins in the Islamic era.  Evidence of indigenous state formation in the Lake Chad area dates back to circa 800 BCE at Zilum.

Religion
The use of proverbs is very apparent in the Kanuri religion of Islam where they are used to help with comprehension of social happenings and to teach the meanings of things. These proverbs are created by the wise old men with a point of view based on the situation and what lesson is trying to be taught. Proverbs will usually reference objects found in everyday life. However, the objects used in the proverbs are used in such a way that they teach social attitudes, beliefs or experiences. Often proverbs are built around necessary acts that are carried out in daily life, but made to be easily visualized and applied to other, more intense situations. Kanuri proverbs can be used as a way to scare or warn the people of foolish or dangerous acts, but can also be more light hearted and encouraging.

The Kanuri became Muslims in the 11th century. Kanem became a centre of Muslim learning and the Kanuri soon controlled all the area surrounding Lake Chad and a powerful empire called Kanem Empire, which reached its height in the sixteenth and seventeenth centuries when they ruled much of Middle Africa.

Traditional state
Following the downfall of the Bornu Empire and the Scramble for Africa in the 19th century, the Kanuri were divided under the rule of the British, French and German Empires.

Despite the loss of the Kanuri-led state, the Shehu of Bornu continues as the head of the Bornu Emirate. This traditional Kanuri/Kanembu state maintains a ceremonial rule of the Kanuri people based in Maiduguri, Borno State, Nigeria but acknowledged by the 4 million Kanuri in neighboring countries. The Shehu ("Sheikh") of Bornu draws his authority from a state founded before 1000 CE, the Kanem-Bornu Empire.

The current ruling line, the al-Kanemi dynasty, dates to the accession of Muhammad al-Amin al-Kanemi in the early 19th century, displacing the Sayfawa dynasty which had ruled from around 1300 CE. The 19th Shehu, Mustafa Ibn Umar El-Kanemi, died in February 2009, and was succeeded by Abubakar Ibn Umar Garbai El-Kanemi.

Political leaders
In Nigeria, famous post-independence Kanuri leaders include the politicians Kashim Ibrahim, Ibrahim Imam, Zannah Bukar Dipcharima, Shettima Ali Monguno, Abba Habib, Muhammad Ngileruma, Baba Gana Kingibe, former GNPP leader Waziri Ibrahim,the former military ruler, Sani Abacha, and the former Presidential Candidate Bashir Tofa.  In Niger, Kanuri political leaders include the former Prime Minister of Niger Mamane Oumarou, and the former President of Niger, Mamadou Tandja.

Kanuri regionalism in Nigeria
A Nigeria specific small Kanuri nationalist movement emerged in 1950s, centred on Bornu.

In 1954, the Borno Youth Movement (BYM) was founded and played a role as a mass regionalist political party up through the end of colonialism, though it petered out at independence.

References

Citations

General sources 
 "Kanuri". Encyclopædia Britannica. 2009. Encyclopædia Britannica Online. Accessed 2 April 2009.
 Fuchs, Peter (1989). Fachi: Sahara-Stadt der Kanuri. 2 vols., Stuttgart: Franz Steiner Verlag Wiesbaden
 Fuchs, Peter (1983). Fachi: Das Brot der Wüste. Stuttgart: Franz Steiner Verlag Wiesbaden
 Lange, Dierk. "Ethnogenesis from within the Chadic state: Some Thoughts on the History of Kanem-Borno", Paideuma: Mitteilungen zur Kulturkunde 39 (1993), 261–277. .
 Malone, Martin J. "Society-Kanuari". Ethnographic Atlas. University of Kent at Canterbury and University of Durham (England, UK).  (No date.) Accessed 5 July 2019.  Archived 4 May 1997.
 "Kanuri". Afrikanische Sprachen. Rüdiger Köppe Verlag online (27 November 2008).

External links
 The Kanuri Studies Association. University of Maiduguri, Borno State, Nigeria.

 
Ethnic groups in Cameroon
Ethnic groups in Chad
Ethnic groups in Nigeria
Ethnic groups in Niger
Muslim communities in Africa
Bornu Empire
Kanem Empire